Arcielda Candiano (fl.  927 - 959) was a Dogaressa of Venice by marriage to the Doge Pietro III Candiano (r. 942 - 959). Her name is sometimes given as Richielda.

Life
She was possibly the child of a Venetian and one of the Slav women who were brought to Venice as captives after the campaign against the Narentian pirates in the Adriatic in 887, before she married Pietro III Candiano. With the death of her husband in 959, Arcielda retired to become a nun as was by that time the custom for widowed dogaresses, though she inherited, through the terms of Pietro's will, a vineyard and other property in the marchese of Veneto, which she gave to the nuns of San Zaccaria.

Her four sons were Pietro IV Candiano (930 - 976), Domenigo Candiano, Bishop of Torcello, Vitale Candiano, Doge of Venice (-979) and Stefano Candiano. Her daughter Elena Candiano and her future husband Gerardo Guoro were the original persons upon whom the English dramatist William Shakespeare based his story Romeo and Juliet.
All this information is invented. Elena Candiano never existed. In early medieval Venice nobody was ever called Elena. For further information, based on medieval primary sources, on the Candiano family and the early medieval Venetians, Luigi Andrea Berto, In Search of the First Venetians: Prosopography of Early Medieval Venice, Studies in the Early Middle Ages (Turnhout: Brepols, 2014).

References

Dogaressas of Venice
Year of birth uncertain
10th-century Venetian people
10th-century Italian women
Arcielda